Martha G. Welch (born June 21, 1944) is an American physician and researcher specializing in the fields of infant and child development. Welch currently serves as an Associate Professor of Psychiatry in Pediatrics and Pathology & Cell Biology at Columbia University Medical Center (CUMC), where she is Co-Director of the Nurture Science Program. Welch's writing and research focuses on the posited benefits of prolonged close physical contact and eye contact between mothers and children. Her book, Holding Time, helped to popularize a form of the controversial practice of attachment therapy. This proposed treatment for autism and problems in mother/child relationships has been criticized as harmful to children and lacking plausibility as a treatment.

Education and early life 
Martha Grace Welch was born in Buffalo, New York and raised in Eggertsville, New York. Her paternal family is descended from the founders of the Welch's Grape Juice Company.

After earning a Bachelor of Arts degree in 1966 from New York University, Welch attended Columbia University's College of Physicians and Surgeons, where she earned her medical degree in 1971. Following medical school, Welch completed a residency in General Psychiatry (1972–1974) and a Fellowship in Child Psychiatry (1974–1977) at the Albert Einstein College of Medicine. She became a Diplomate of the American Board of Psychiatry and Neurology on November 30, 1977.

Career path 
From 1975 to 1997, Welch operated a private practice, specializing in the treatment of emotional, behavioral and developmental disorders, including autism, maintaining offices in New York City and Greenwich, CT. In 1997, she joined the faculty at Columbia University Medical Center's College of Physicians and Surgeons in the Department of Psychiatry. Here, she began preclinical research investigating secretin and oxytocin in the brain and the effects of combined oxytocin/secretin on an animal model of inflammatory bowel disease. In 2004 she began a collaboration with Michael D. Gershon M.D. pioneering research on the role of oxytocin in the gut. Welch and Gershon later established the Columbia University Brain Gut Initiative to further their understanding the mechanisms of nurture and they condition the brain-gut axis.  In 2008 Welch was jointly appointed in Columbia University's Department of Pathology and Cell Biology. In 2010 Welch was jointly appointed in Columbia University's Department of Pediatrics, where she is conducting research on Family Nurture Intervention in the neonatal intensive care unit of New York-Presbyterian Hospital. In 2013, Welch became Co-Director of the Nurture Science Program in the Department of Pediatrics.

Attachment therapy controversy

Welch was a proponent of a form of the controversial practice of attachment therapy, and originated a variety of it sometimes termed Festhaltetherapie, Holding Time, or Prolonged Parent–Child Embrace. The practice has been proposed as a means of treating autism or preventing problems in the parent/child relationship.  It includes forcing a child to face their mother while seated on her lap, arms restrained by crossing them in front of the child. For larger children, the mother instead lies on top of the child while supporting herself partially with her elbows. The mother and child are then encouraged to express their emotions to one another while in this position. 

While the variety of attachment therapy promoted by Welch has not been associated with the child injuries and deaths that have been associated with similar forms of attachment therapy, it has been subject to controversy. One researcher has pointed out that several aspects of the practice would be classified as adverse childhood experiences if done outside a clinical context. These aspects include causing children physical pain and fear of pain, restraint, and causing children to feel as if they have no one to protect them. They have also noted that the genetic basis for autism makes this form of attachment therapy, which aims to cure autism by repairing the mother/child bond, implausible as a treatment for autism. Other critics have noted that attachment therapy practices, including "physical coercion, psychologically or physically enforced holding, physical restraint, physical domination, provoked catharsis, [and] ventilation of rage" are not recommended and should not be used because they lack proven benefit and risk harming the child.

Awards and honors 
 2019 Awarded Distinguished Fellowship of the American Psychiatric Association
 2014  Gold Medal for Meritorious Service to Columbia University. College of Physicians & Surgeons
 2013  P&S Alumni Lifetime Learning Award
 2011 Columbia University Alumni Medal for Meritorious Service
 1995 Middlebury College Distinguished Alumni Award

Personal life 
Welch lives in New York City with her partner, Robert J. Ludwig, the managing director of the Nurture Science Program at Columbia University Medical Center's Department of Pediatrics. She has one son, and two grandsons living in Houston, Texas.

References 

1944 births
New York University alumni
Columbia University Vagelos College of Physicians and Surgeons alumni
Living people
People from Buffalo, New York
Physicians from New York (state)
20th-century American physicians
20th-century American women physicians
21st-century American physicians
21st-century American women physicians
Columbia University faculty
American women academics